The Eastern Railroad was a railroad connecting Boston, Massachusetts to Portland, Maine. Throughout its history, it competed with the Boston and Maine Railroad for service between the two cities, until the Boston & Maine put an end to the competition by leasing the Eastern in December 1884. Much of the railroad's main line in Massachusetts is used by the MBTA's Newburyport/Rockport commuter rail line, and some unused parts of its right-of-way have been converted to rail trails.

Origins and construction 

The Eastern Railroad Company of Massachusetts was first chartered on April 14, 1836. The line followed the coastline, in contrast to the Boston & Maine's inland route through Massachusetts, and it served North Shore cities such as Lynn, Salem, Beverly, and Newburyport. In keeping with its coastal route, the Eastern Railroad chose to place its Boston terminus in East Boston, a short ferry ride from downtown Boston, rather than building tracks around Chelsea Creek, the Boston Inner Harbor, and the Mystic River into the city.

Construction on the railroad began in August 1837 after state loans and a change of route were approved in April. The first stretch to be built was from East Boston to Salem, completed August 27, 1838. An extension to Ipswich was completed on December 18, 1839, followed by an extension to Newburyport on August 28, 1840, and to the New Hampshire state line on November 9, 1840. A branch line to Marblehead opened on December 10, 1839, followed by a branch line to Gloucester in 1847 and a branch line to Amesbury in 1848. In 1861, the Gloucester branch was extended to Rockport. On August 31, 1846, the Eastern leased the Essex Branch Railroad for 5 years, and in 1865 it bought the branch outright.

The railroad's short segment through New Hampshire was chartered as a separate corporation by the New Hampshire legislature on June 18, 1836. Construction on the New Hampshire segment began in 1839 and was completed on November 9, 1840. On February 18, 1840 the Eastern Railroad of New Hampshire was leased to the Eastern Railroad of Massachusetts for a period of 99 years.

By 1843, the Eastern entered into an agreement with the Boston & Maine to share the Portland, Saco and Portsmouth Railroad's tracks in Maine, which allowed both railroads to begin providing Boston-to-Portland service. On April 28, 1847, the Eastern and the Boston & Maine co-leased the Portland, Saco & Portsmouth for a period of 99 years.

Competition and decline 

By the 1850s, the Eastern was experiencing difficulties because of the out-of-the-way location of its East Boston terminal. In 1845, the competing Boston & Maine Railroad had completed its own tracks into Boston so it would no longer have to use the Boston and Lowell Railroad's tracks. It also built a terminal in downtown Boston just north of Haymarket.

Several independent railroads sought to take advantage of the situation by building branch lines that would connect the Eastern Railroad's North Shore tracks with the Boston & Maine line going into the city. In 1850, the South Reading Branch Railroad opened, connecting the Eastern at Salem to the Boston & Maine at Wakefield, and in 1853, the Saugus Branch Railroad opened, connecting the Eastern at Lynn to the Boston & Maine at Malden. The Eastern bought the South Reading Branch Railroad in 1851 and the Saugus Branch Railroad in 1866.

The Eastern Railroad was finally able to offer service to downtown Boston when it leased the Grand Junction Railroad in 1852. The Grand Junction was a short line chartered in 1847 that connected the East Boston waterfront to the Boston & Maine, Boston & Lowell, and Fitchburg railroads in East Somerville, and it was eventually extended to connect to the Boston and Worcester Railroad in Allston. After leasing the Grand Junction, the Eastern built a cut-off from the Grand Junction to its own tracks in Chelsea and built a terminal in downtown Boston, approximately on the site of the present North Station. It also disconnected the Saugus Branch from the Boston & Maine at Medford, redirecting it south to the Grand Junction in Everett. In 1866, the Boston & Worcester bought the Grand Junction, but allowed the Eastern to keep its track rights for the sections it used as part of its main line.

In the 1870s, the Eastern expanded its service in New Hampshire. It leased the Portsmouth, Great Falls and Conway Railroad for 60 years on January 6, 1872, the Wolfeborough Railroad for 68 years on August 14, 1872, and the Portsmouth and Dover Railroad for 50 years on February 1, 1874.

On August 14, 1872, the Eastern leased the Newburyport City Railroad for 20 years. In 1872, Eastern also bought the Portland, Saco, and Portsmouth Railroad outright. In 1881, the Chelsea Beach Railroad was founded, and it was leased by the Eastern on July 2 of the same year.

On December 23, 1883, the competition between the Eastern Railroad and the Boston & Maine ended when the Boston & Maine leased the Eastern for 54 years. On May 9, 1890, the Boston & Maine purchased the Eastern outright, dissolving the company. The Boston & Maine incorporated the Eastern's tracks into its Portland Division as an alternative route to Maine and for continued service to the North Shore.

In 1893, North Station was opened in downtown Boston as a union station, consolidating under one roof the Boston terminals of four different railroads: the Eastern, the Boston & Maine, the Boston & Lowell (which was also controlled by the Boston & Maine), and the Fitchburg Railroad (which the Boston & Maine bought in 1900). And in 1905, the Grand Junction and Eastern Railroads combined their East Boston terminals.

Incidents 

On September 28, 1841, noted abolitionist Frederick Douglass and James N. Buffum (later mayor of Lynn) were forcibly ejected from a train at Lynn station after Douglass refused to sit in the segregated "Jim Crow car" in an early protest against the racial discrimination by the railroad. Fearing additional incidents, railroad superintendent Stephen A. Chase ordered that trains not stop at Lynn for several days. The actions by Douglass sparked further protests in Massachusetts against the discriminatory policies of the Eastern and other railroads.

On November 3, 1848, an accident occurred in Salem, Massachusetts. A southbound train heading for Marblehead missed an unattended switch and was routed onto the wrong track, into the path of a train heading north from Lynn to Salem. The two engines collided head-on. A total of 6 people were killed on the Marblehead train, and about 40 people were injured in the wreck. The Salem-bound train was carrying a party of Whigs, and the Marblehead-bound train was carrying a party of Democrats who were campaigning for the 1848 presidential election that would take place four days later.

On August 26, 1871, a series of dispatching errors allowed the Portland Express to collide with the rear of a stalled local train in Revere, telescoping the rear cars of the stopped train. Coal-oil lamps ignited the wreckage, and 29 died while 57 were injured. Several prominent Boston citizens were killed, bringing national publicity to the accident. It remains the deadliest railroad accident in Massachusetts history.

Stations

Portland Division Eastern Mainline

Current status 
In the 1970s, the Massachusetts Bay Transportation Authority (MBTA) acquired the Eastern Railroad's tracks along with several other Boston & Maine passenger lines. It currently runs commuter rail service on the Newburyport/Rockport Line to Newburyport and Rockport along the Eastern's former main line and the Gloucester & Rockport branch line.

Portions of the former Portsmouth, Great Falls and Conway Railroad, once operated by the Eastern Railroad and later run as the Conway Branch of the Boston & Maine, are in active service as the heritage Conway Scenic Railroad.

Some unused parts of the Eastern's right-of-way have been converted into rail trails, including the Eastern Trail in Maine, the Clipper City Rail Trail in Newburyport, the Marblehead Rail Trail in Marblehead, and the Old Eastern Marsh Rail Trail in Salisbury, Massachusetts. In August 2019, New Hampshire purchased  from Hampton to Portsmouth for $5 million for use as a rail trail.

The Newburyport City Branch between Parker Street and Water Street, abandoned in 1971, was converted to Phase II of the Clipper City Rail Trail in 2019. In July 2020, the state awarded $100,000 for construction of an additional  section north of Water Street.

References

External links 
 
 

Defunct Massachusetts railroads
Railway companies established in 1836
Railway companies disestablished in 1890
Predecessors of the Boston and Maine Railroad
Defunct Maine railroads
Defunct New Hampshire railroads
American companies disestablished in 1890
American companies established in 1836